, son of Mototada, was kugyo or highest-ranking Japanese court noble of the Kamakura period (1185–1333). Fuyuhira adopted him as a son. Morohira was his adopted son. He held a regent position Kampaku from 1330 to 1333.

References
 https://web.archive.org/web/20070927231943/http://nekhet.ddo.jp/people/japan/fstakatukasa.html

1295 births
1337 deaths
Fujiwara clan
Takatsukasa family
People of Kamakura-period Japan
People of Nanboku-chō-period Japan